Cabinet wars, derived from the German expression Kabinettskriege (singular Kabinettskrieg), were the type of wars which affected Europe during the period of absolute monarchies, from the 1648 Peace of Westphalia to the 1789 French Revolution.

References

Warfare of the Early Modern period
Wars by type